Anne Calvert, Baroness Baltimore (née Hon. Anne Arundell; c. 1615/1616 – 23 July 1649) was an English noblewoman, the daughter of Thomas Arundell, 1st Baron Arundell of Wardour by his second wife Anne Philipson, and wife of Lord Baltimore, who founded the Province of Maryland colony. Anne Arundel County in the US state of Maryland was named for her.

Family
She married Cecil Calvert, second Lord Baltimore. A settlement arrangement for the union was made on 20 March 1627/28. According to Gibbs, she is said to have been a most beautiful and accomplished woman. The marriage coincided with the groom's father Sir George Calvert, first Lord Baltimore, (1578-1632) embarking on his first colonial endeavor in Avalon, located in Newfoundland (of future eastern Canada). Following the failure of the Avalon Colony, Cecil Calvert oversaw a second colonial enterprise in 1633, this time aimed at the Chesapeake Bay area, north of the colony of Virginia. The new colony was named "Maryland" after Henrietta Maria, the French-born consort of King Charles I.

Four of the couple's nine children survived to adulthood.
 Charles Calvert, 3rd Baron Baltimore (b. 27 August 1637, died 21 February 1715)
 Hon. Cecil Calvert
 Hon. Georgiana Calvert (b. August 1629)
 Hon. Mary Calvert (born 18 July 1630)
 Hon. George Calvert (b. 15 September 1634 – d. Jun 1636)
 Hon. Anne Calvert (born 9 October 1636 – died 6 May 1661)
 Hon. Mary Calvert (b. 30 November 1638 – on or before 24 September 1671)
 Hon. Elizabeth Calvert (born circa 1642 – died 16 January 1712)
 Hon. Frances Calvert

Lady Anne Arundell was buried at the St. John's Parish church in Tisbury, Wiltshire in England.

References

External links
Calvert Family Tree; retrieved 10 July 2013

1610s births
1649 deaths
Anne Arundell
Daughters of barons
Anne Arundell
People from Arundel
Baltimore
17th-century English women
English Roman Catholics
Date of birth unknown
Anne Arundel County, Maryland
Burials at Tisbury parish church, St John's